Sérgio de Oliveira Cabral Santos Filho (born January 27, 1963) is a Brazilian politician and a journalist

He was elected governor of the state of Rio de Janeiro in the 2006 Brazilian general election and sworn into office on January 1, 2007. Cabral Filho was a representative in the Rio de Janeiro state legislature from 1991 to 2002 and its president from 1995 to 2002.

He ran for mayor of Rio de Janeiro in 1996 on a PSDB Brazilian Social Democratic Party (PSDB) ticket, but his election as governor happened after he switched to the PMDB (Brazilian Democratic Movement Party). He and his running mate, Luiz Fernando de Sousa, won 68% of the valid votes (5,129,064 votes) in the second round of voting against the Popular Socialist Party (PPS) candidate Denise Frossard, who received only 32% of valid votes.

Cabral was selected to make formal apologies to 120 individuals, including Dilma Rousseff, Brazil's 36th president, for human rights abuses inflicted on them during the dictatorship that was in power in Brazil from 1964 to 1985.

On November 17, 2016, Cabral was arrested on charges of corruption. He has been sentenced to jail.

Tenure as governor
Cabral became governor at a time of uncertain economic prospects and serious security challenges in his state of Rio de Janeiro.  During the election campaign for governor in 2006, he had praised the "zero tolerance" security model touted by New York City Mayor Rudy Giuliani and pledged to root out police corruption and improve services in Rio's favelas.

After visiting Colombia in 2007 to observe that country's success in the realm of public safety, Cabral secured additional funding for the police and tasked Public Security Secretary, José Mariano Beltrame with spearheading a plan to improve security.  In 2008, the state and city governments launched a community policing program called Pacifying Police Units, or UPPs, in Rio. In contrast to previous police practices, UPPs created a sustained, long-term police presence in favelas, including the Cidade de Deus, Complexo do Alemão and Santa Marta. Their operations made use of Rio military police's BOPE units in fighting urban crime and also use their Police Pacification Units for extended policing.  These methods led to decreased homicide rates in the favelas where UPPs were set up.

The magazine Brasil de Fato described him in 2007 as a political figure who " relentlessly justifies police violence in poor areas of the city. His latest statement was to claim that people living in the favelas are being paid by drug traffickers to complain about police raids."

In healthcare, Cabral launched a mobile health unit that travels around the state giving free tests to the public in local areas.

Cabral also streamlined management of the state's finances through tax adjustments and adoption of strict modern management techniques such as electronic bidding. These measures led Rio de Janeiro to become the first Brazilian state to be ranked as "investment grade", by the world's most important risk rating agency, Standard & Poor's. At the time, the agency announced that "the strong management that has prevailed in the State over the past three years" and the fact that the state was "backed by a strong and diverse economy with an estimated GDP per capita of around 25% above the average in Brazil" made it achieve a global rating of "BBB-" and a "brAAA" credit rating on national scale.

His first tenure as governor was also marked by achievements for the LGBT community, especially the creation of Rio Sem Homofobia (Rio Without Homophobia), a program that aims to combat homophobia in public policies in the state. Cabral was also the first governor of Rio de Janeiro to participate in an LGBT parade.

In transportation, Cabral renovated the fleet of SuperVia trains, which had only ten trains in 2007 with air conditioning. Today, all 100 trains have air conditioning. He was also the governor who built most kilometers of underground metro lines since the subway began operation in the 1970s.

Security improvements, economic growth and Rio winning the bid for the 2016 Summer Olympics helped to increase Cabral's popularity and led him to an easy re-election victory in the 2010 Rio de Janeiro gubernatorial election, with more than 66% of the vote. He was seen as a key ally to Presidents Lula and Dilma and was regarded as potential vice presidential candidate.

Awards 

On September 14, 2009, Sérgio Cabral received the Légion d'honneur (National Order of the Legion of Honor), the highest award of the French government. The medal ceremony took place in Paris in the French Senate.

On May 8, 2008, Cabral received an award as the 2008 Personalidade Cidadania, or Good Citizen Award, for the roster of his political and social achievements during his tenure in the legislative and executive branches of government. He was selected by 4,327 representatives from various segments of civil society, by direct voting. The prize is an initiative of Unesco, Folha Dirigida and Associação Brasileira de Imprensa (ABI).

In 2013, Cabral received the Brazilian Person of the Year award from the Spain-Brazil Chamber of Commerce for his contribution to health and public safety in state of Rio through the projects of the public health assistance units and UPPs.

Corruption charges and arrest 

Recently, he was accused of charging 5% on every contract awarded to Odebrecht, including those for restoring the Maracanã stadium and the Coperj railroad.
According to the Folha de S.Paulo newspaper, he was implicated in Operation Car Wash by Benedicto Barbosa da Silva Júnior, the companies' director.

On November 17, 2016, the Federal Police of Brazil arrested Sérgio Cabral and seven other persons (including former secretaries of his government), as part of Operation Car Wash.

He was accused of embezzling 224 million Brazilian reals, more than $80 million US. On December 6, 2016, the court heard charges filed by the Federal Public Prosecutor's Office (MPF), then charged Sérgio Cabral with corruption, racketeering and money laundering.
On the same day, Adriana Ancelmo, Cabral's wife, was also arrested.
 
In February 2017, the MPF-RJ accused Cabral as part of Operation Efficiency, another operation connected to Operation Car Wash.

On 13 June 2017, he was sentenced to 14 years and two months of imprisonment for passive corruption and money laundering. On 20 September 2017 he was sentenced to an additional 45 years imprisonment for embezzlement.

On July 3, 2018, within the scope of the Carwash probe; failed Brazilian businessman Eike Batista was convicted of bribing Cabral for state government contracts, paying him US$16.6 million. Held at the Gericinó penitentiary in Bangu, Rio de Janeiro, Brazil, Batista was sentenced to 30 year imprisonment; Brazilian law limits sentences to 30 years served.

References

1963 births
Living people
Writers from Rio de Janeiro (city)
Governors of Rio de Janeiro (state)
Brazilian journalists
Male journalists
Members of the Federal Senate (Brazil)
Brazilian Social Democracy Party politicians
Brazilian Democratic Movement politicians
Brazilian politicians convicted of corruption
Bribery scandals
Money laundering